The People's Alliance was a Bulgarian party created on 14 October 1921 by a group of non-party university teachers. Among its founders were Aleksandar Grekov, Aleksandar Tsankov, Petko Staynov, Dimitar Mishaykov and others.

The purpose of the People's Alliance was to stop the growing influence of the leftists and the authoritarian rule of the Bulgarian Agrarian People's Union. After the government of Aleksandar Stamboliyski eliminated the leaders of the opposition Constitutional Bloc in the end of 1922 and the fraud of the 1923 elections, the leaders of the People's Alliance allied with the Military Union and the Internal Macedonian Revolutionary Organization which was decisive for the 9 June coup d'état. After the coup the People's Alliance entered in the newly formed party Democratic Alliance.

The People's Alliance was sometimes called by its opponents the "Black Bloc" or the "Black Blood Bloc".

Leaders
 1921–1922: Aleksandar Grekov
 1922–1923: Aleksandar Tsankov
 1924–1925: Mitko Halvadzhiev

Notes

Political parties established in 1921
Political parties disestablished in 1923
1921 establishments in Bulgaria
Defunct political parties in Bulgaria